Tisch Library, originally Wessell Library, is the principal library for the Medford/Somerville campus of Tufts University.

Description
The library holds 2.7 million volumes and serves as the main branch of the Tufts library system. Tisch Library has two branches focused on the arts: Lilly Music Library at the Granoff Music Center in Medford, and the W. Van Alan Clark, Jr. Library at the School of the Museum of Fine Arts at Tufts in Boston.

, the library houses stacks and the Tufts Archival Research Center on Level G; stacks, study rooms, and the Mark Computer Lab on the first floor; circulation, the Hirsh Reading Room, the Data Lab, and the Tower Café on the second floor; and classroom space and the Digital Design Studio on the third floor.

The Tisch Library is a member of the Boston Library Consortium, a library consortium of academic libraries located in New England.

History
The building was originally designed in a brutalist style by Campbell and Aldrich. Construction started in January 1964, and the library was originally named after Tufts' eighth president Nils Yngve Wessell. The $2.9 million library was dedicated in September 1965. Wessell Library succeeded Eaton Memorial Library as the main library on campus, and was constructed next to it. 

The original 1965 structure contained stacks and offices on the first floor; circulation, a reference desk, and study space on the second floor; and special collections, including the Crane School collection, the Tufts collection, and audio-visual aids, on the third floor. 

From August 1994 to October 1996, the library was enlarged in a $21 million renovation, designed by Shepley Bulfinch Richardson and Abbott. The project added  to Wessell, and renovated the original structure.

Upon completion of the renovation, the library was renamed after Jonathan and Steve Tisch, who had donated $10 million for the project. The rechristened library was formally dedicated on October 10, 1996. As the library's collections continued to grow, unfinished space beneath the first floor was converted to stacks and study space, opening to the public as "Level G" in 2004. That same year, the Tower Café opened on the second floor.

W. Van Alan Clark, Jr. Library 
The Clark Library, located at the School of the Museum of Fine Arts at Tufts (SMFA) in the Fenway-Kenmore district of Boston, is the fine arts branch of the Tisch Library. It is not affiliated with the Fenway Library Organization, a consortium of several other nearby university and museum libraries. The Clark Library collection is focused "on contemporary art and studio practice, our collections encompass exhibition catalogs, monographs, theoretical and art historical texts, technical manuals, periodicals, media, artists' books, zines, and more".

With the late-2022 opening of the Green Line Extension of the MBTA Green Line E branch light rail transit route, there is a one-seat direct connection between the SMFA and the main campus of Tufts University in Medford.

References

External links
 
 Library Digital Collections

Library buildings completed in 1965
University and college academic libraries in the United States
Buildings at Tufts University
Brutalist architecture in Massachusetts
Libraries in Middlesex County, Massachusetts